The 2016 Phillip Island Superbike World Championship round was the first round of the 2016 Superbike World Championship. It took place over the weekend of 26–28 February 2016 at the Phillip Island Grand Prix Circuit.

Championship standings after the round

Superbike Championship standings after Race 1

Superbike Championship standings after Race 2

Supersport Championship standings

External links
 Superbike Race 1 results
 Superbike Race 2 results
 Supersport Race results

2016 Superbike World Championship season
Phillip Island Superbike World Championship round
Phillip Island Superbike World Championship round